The Downingtown STEM (Science, Technology, Engineering, and Math) Academy is a public high school and an IB World School in the Downingtown Area School District, located in Downingtown, Pennsylvania. The school has a unique curriculum that prepares students for college education and careers in the STEM fields. A major focus in the courses offered at the Downingtown STEM Academy is inquiry and project-based learning, as well as the growth of 21st-century learning skills (communication, collaboration, critical thinking, creativity). In the ninth and tenth grades, students take "pre-diploma" classes that prepare them for classes in the International Baccalaureate program. In the eleventh and twelfth grades, students take six classes in the International Baccalaureate and have the opportunity to participate in the IB Diploma Programme.

The school became an International Baccalaureate school in January 2012. Students in the eleventh and twelfth grade can participate in the IB Diploma Programme to achieve an IB diploma, in addition to their diploma from the Downingtown Area School District.

The school's enrollment is approximately 800 students. Being a smaller school, students are engaged in a more personalized learning environment. Admission into the school is required to attend.

The school's laptop initiative provides each student with a computer. Technology is utilized as a tool that enhances learning.

The former Downingtown Educational Center/Ninth Grade Center was renovated to become the Downingtown STEM Academy in Fall of 2011.

As of December 11, 2013, the Downingtown STEM Academy was ranked as the top public high school in the state of Pennsylvania, achieving a School Performance Profile score of 101.4, and in 2017 received a 104.0.

In 2018, U.S. News & World Report ranked the Downingtown STEM Academy as the number one public high school in the state of Pennsylvania, and number thirty-four in the United States.

References

External links
 Official Site

Downingtown Area School District
Public high schools in Pennsylvania
Schools in Chester County, Pennsylvania
Educational institutions established in 2011
Magnet schools in Pennsylvania
2011 establishments in Pennsylvania